The striped laughingthrush (Trochalopteron virgatum) is a species of bird in the family Leiothrichidae.

It is found in the Patkai range, where its natural habitat is subtropical or tropical moist montane forests.

References

 BirdLife International 2004.  Garrulax virgatus.   2006 IUCN Red List of Threatened Species.   Downloaded on 25 July 2007.

striped laughingthrush
Birds of the Patkai
striped laughingthrush
Taxonomy articles created by Polbot